The 17th Raiders Wing  is the Italian Air Force special forces unit. It is the youngest special force created in Italy. It is based in Furbara, near Rome and part of the Comando interforze per le Operazioni delle Forze Speciali (COFS—Special Forces Operations Command). Until 8 April 2008 the unit was named Reparto Incursori Aeronautica Militare (RIAM—Air Force Raiders Group) but with the expansion and evolution of the unit's assignments and its size, the name was changed to "17° Stormo Incursori".

Specialisations
 Combat Search and Rescue (C-SAR)
 Combat Controller (Forward Air Controller and Joint Terminal Attack Controller)
 Pathfinder
 Direct actions against airbases and aeronautical compounds

Organization

Raiders Group
Raiders Group divided into: Command, Operations, Vehicles and Special Equipment, and four squadriglie (wings) of raiders, each of two to four detachments of eight to twelve soldiers. This means that the entire operational force will be (at full strength) from 64 to 192 soldiers.

Training Group
This branch provides training for the operational main force but is also capable of providing training sessions on: Evasion and Escape and EOD/EOR/IEDD to other Italian army and navy units.

Vehicles and equipment
17th Stormo is part of 1st Special Ops Air Brigade which also includes 9th Stormo equipped with modern HH-101A Caesar helicopters. C-130J "Hercules IIs" and C-27J "Spartans" are also available.  In the field the operative force is equipped with the VTLM "Lince", quads and jeeps.

This unit has access to a large arsenal of sniper rifles and anti-materiel rifles to be used to knock out aircraft. It also uses mini UAVs such as the "Strix" produced by Galileo Avionica, and L-3 Communication's "ROVER IV".

The 17º Stormo Incursori has a variety of armament and equipment.

Personal weapons
 9x19mm Beretta Px4 Storm Type D  
 9x19mm Glock 17  
 5,7x28mm FN Five-seven 
 Heckler & Koch MP7

Assault and battle rifles
 5,56x45mm Heckler & Koch 416 
 Heckler & Koch G36
 FN SCAR
 ARX-160A2
 7,62x51mm Heckler & Koch HK417
 MP-5A3 
 MP-5SD3
 Benelli M4

Sniper rifles
 7,62x51mm Sr-25/Mk-11
 7,62x51mm Sako TRG-22
 8,6x70mm Sako TRG-42

Anti-materiel rifles
 10,4x77mm BCM Europearms Extreme MAAR
 12,7x99mm Barrett M-82A1
 12,7x99mm PGM Hécate II

Combat accessories
 Aimpoint 
 Trijicon
 Schmidt & Bender PM-2
 LAM 100/200 laser pointer 
 EOTech sights
 AN/PEQ-2 insight system
 AN/PEQ-4 insight system
 AN/PEQ-15 insight system
 Mako MEPRO MOR insight system
 Insight Mk23 thermal camera

References 

Air force special forces units
Air force units and formations of Italy
Special forces of Italy
Military units and formations established in 2003